The 1962–63 season was the 55th year of football played by Dundee United, and covers the period from 1 July 1962 to 30 June 1963. United finished in seventh place in the First Division.

Match results
Dundee United played a total of 48 competitive matches during the 1962–63 season.

Legend

All results are written with Dundee United's score first.
Own goals in italics

First Division

Scottish Cup

League Cup

See also
 1962–63 in Scottish football

References

Dundee United F.C. seasons
Dundee United